Liga Deportiva Universitaria de Quito's 1971 season was the club's 41st year of existence, the 18th year in professional football and the 12th in the top level of professional football in Ecuador.

Competitions

Serie A

First stage

Results

Liguilla Final

Results

External links

RSSSF - 1971 Serie A 

1971